Vladislav Azizovich Kadyrov (born 16 November 1970 in Baku) is an Azerbaijani professional football coach and a former player. He also holds Russian citizenship.

Managerial statistics

Honours
 1987 FIFA U-16 World Championship champion for USSR.
 USSR Federation Cup finalist: 1988.
 Russian Second League top scorer: 1994 (Zone East, 34 goals).

External links

Career summary by KLISF

1970 births
Living people
Russian footballers
Soviet footballers
Azerbaijani footballers
Azerbaijani football managers
Azerbaijan international footballers
Azerbaijani expatriate footballers
FC Arsenal Tula players
Footballers from Baku
FK Mughan managers
Association football midfielders
FC Lokomotiv Nizhny Novgorod players
Neftçi PFK players
Russian people of Chechen descent
Azerbaijani people of Chechen descent
Ravan Baku FK managers
FC Spartak Ryazan players